Salem Sue (or The World's Largest Holstein Cow) is a giant fiberglass Holstein cow sculpture located in New Salem, North Dakota, United States. Salem Sue was built in 1974 for $40,000, by donations from local farmers and residents, and was sponsored by the New Salem Lions Club in honor of the local dairy farming industry. 
The artist was Dave Oswald, who is also known for designing the world's largest catfish, which sits in Wahpeton, North Dakota. The cow, which is hollow, was constructed by Sculpture Mfg. Co in La Crosse, Wisconsin and then transported in 3 parts before being put together. It sits on School Hill near Interstate 94 off exit 127 S and can be viewed for several miles.

Salem Sue was the second giant roadside animal sculpture built in North Dakota, after the world's largest buffalo was erected in Jamestown, North Dakota in 1959.

A road leads up to the base of the statue, where one may view the surrounding terrain for a distance of several miles. 
Although it is free to visit, an at-will donation bin, shaped like a milk can, sits at the bottom of the hill to help maintain the property and re-paint the cow as needed.

A brochure available at the nearby gas station contains the "Ballad of the Holstein" to the tune of "Joy to the World":

References

External links
Salem Sue at Roadside America
Salem Sue at Dakota Search

1974 sculptures
Buildings and structures in Morton County, North Dakota
Cattle in art
Fiberglass sculptures in North Dakota
Fictional cattle
Outdoor sculptures in North Dakota
Roadside attractions in North Dakota
Tourist attractions in Morton County, North Dakota
1974 establishments in North Dakota